In mathematics, the trace operator extends the notion of the restriction of a function to the boundary of its domain to "generalized" functions in a Sobolev space. This is particularly important for the study of partial differential equations with prescribed boundary conditions (boundary value problems), where weak solutions may not be regular enough to satisfy the boundary conditions in the classical sense of functions.

Motivation 
On a bounded, smooth domain , consider the problem of solving Poisson's equation with inhomogeneous Dirichlet boundary conditions:

The weak solution  of this equation must satisfy

 for all .

It is not apparent, however, in which sense  can satisfy the boundary condition  on : by definition,  is an equivalence class of functions which can have arbitrary values on  since this is a null set with respect to the n-dimensional Lebesgue measure.

For the definition of the trace operator to be reasonable, there must hold  for sufficiently regular .

Trace theorem 

Let  for  be a bounded domain with Lipschitz boundary. Then there exists a bounded linear trace operator
 
such that  extends the classical trace, i.e.
  for all . 
The continuity of  implies that 
  for all  

Construction 

This paragraph follows Evans, where more details can be found, and assumes that  has a -boundary. A proof (of a stronger version) of the trace theorem for Lipschitz domains can be found in Gagliardo. On a -domain, the trace operator can be defined as continuous linear extension of the operator

 

to the space .

  for all 

is the central ingredient in the construction of the trace operator. A local variant of this estimate for -functions is first proven for a locally flat boundary using the divergence theorem. By transformation, a general -boundary can be locally straightened to reduce to this case, where the -regularity of the transformation requires that the local estimate holds for -functions.

Let  be a sequence approximating  by density.

The case p = ∞ 

If  is bounded and has a -boundary then by Morrey's inequality there exists a continuous embedding , where  denotes the space of Lipschitz continuous functions. In particular, any function  has a classical trace  and there holds

Functions with trace zero 

The following alternative characterization holds:

 

Image of the trace operator

For p > 1 

As elaborated below the image consists of functions which satisfy a -version of Hölder continuity.

Abstract characterization 
An abstract characterization of the image of  can be derived as follows. By the isomorphism theorems there holds

 

Equipping the quotient space with the quotient norm defined by

 

the trace operator  is then a surjective, bounded linear operator

 .

Characterization using Sobolev–Slobodeckij spaces 

A more concrete representation of the image of  can be given using Sobolev-Slobodeckij spaces which generalize the concept of Hölder continuous functions to the -setting. Since  is a (n-1)-dimensional Lipschitz manifold embedded into  an explicit characterization of these spaces is technically involved. For simplicity consider first a planar domain . For  define the (possibly infinite) norm

 

which generalizes the Hölder condition . Then

 

The space  can then be identified as the image of the trace operator and there holds that

 

is a surjective, bounded linear operator.

For p = 1 

 

is a surjective, bounded linear operator.

Right-inverse: trace extension operator 

The trace operator is not injective since multiple functions in  can have the same trace (or equivalently). The trace operator has however a well-behaved right-inverse, which extends a function defined on the boundary to the whole domain. Specifically,  for  there exists a bounded, linear trace extension operator

 ,

using the Sobolev-Slobodeckij characterization of the trace operator's image from the previous section, such that

  for all 

and, by continuity, there exists  with

 .

Notable is not the mere existence but the linearity and continuity of the right inverse. This trace extension operator must not be confused with the whole-space extension operators  which play a fundamental role in the theory of Sobolev spaces.

Extension to other spaces

Higher derivatives 

Let  and  be a bounded domain with -boundary. Then there exists a surjective, bounded linear higher-order trace operator

 

The operator  extends the classical normal traces in the sense that

  for all 

 .

 .

Less regular spaces

No trace in Lp 

Generalized normal trace 

Let  denote the distributional divergence of a vector field . For  and bounded Lipschitz domain  define

which is a Banach space with norm

.

Then there exists a bounded linear operator

 ,

 .

Application. This result is notable since in Lipschitz domains in general , such that  may not lie in the domain of the trace operator .

Application 

The theorems presented above allow a closer investigation of the boundary value problem

on a Lipschitz domain  from the motivation. Since only the Hilbert space case  is investigated here, the notation  is used to denote  etc. As stated in the motivation, a weak solution  to this equation must satisfy  and

 for all ,

Existence and uniqueness of weak solutions 

This regularity is also sufficient for the existence of a weak solution, which can be seen as follows. By the trace extension theorem there exists  such that . The function  then satisfies the integral equation

 for all .

By the Riesz representation theorem there exists a unique solution  to this problem. By uniqueness of the decomposition , this is equivalent to the existence of a unique weak solution  to the inhomogeneous boundary value problem.

Continuous dependence on the data 

 

 

and the solution map

 

is therefore continuous.

See also 

 Trace class
 Nuclear operators between Banach spaces

References

Leoni, Giovanni (2017). A First Course in Sobolev Spaces: Second Edition. Graduate Studies in Mathematics. 181. American Mathematical Society. pp. 734. 

Sobolev spaces
Operator theory

de:Sobolev-Raum#Spuroperator